The Longhorn Jamboree Presents: Willie Nelson & His Friends is a 1976 album recorded by country singer and composer Willie Nelson.

Track listing 
"What a Way to Live"
"Misery Mansion"
"Rainy Day Blues"
"Night Life"
"Man With the Blues"
"The Storm Has Just Begun"
"Mississippi Woman" (Red Lane)
"West Virginia Man" (Coe)
"What'd I Say" (Ray Charles)
"Save the Last Dance for Me" (Doc Pomus, Mort Shuman)
"Honey Don't" (Perkins)
"Blue Suede Shoes" (Perkins)

Tracks 1-6 performed by Willie Nelson, 7-8 by David Allan Coe, 9-10 by Jerry Lee Lewis, 11-12 by Carl Perkins

Personnel
Willie Nelson - Vocals, Guitar

References

1976 albums
Willie Nelson albums
Plantation Records albums